Walenty Dymek (1888–1956) was the Archbishop of Poznań from 1946 to 1956.

He was born on 31 December 1888 in Połajewo, was Auxiliary Bishop of Poznań in the years 1929–1946, and was Archbishop of Poznań from 1946 to 1956.

He died 22 October 1956 in Poznań.

References

Bishops of Poznań
20th-century Roman Catholic archbishops in Poland
1888 births
1956 deaths
Member of the Tomasz Zan Society